Piotr Kuleta (born 27 June 1989 in Chrzanów) is a Polish sprint canoeist. At the 2012 Summer Olympics, he competed in the Men's C-1 200 metres and the men's C-1 1000 m.  He did not originally qualify for the Olympics, but was called up when Pawel Baraszkiewicz was injured.

His uncle Tomasz Kuleta originally encouraged him to try canoeing, and then Adam Smyk, a neighbour who was also a canoe coach, encouraged him to join a canoeing club.

In 2015, he was named athlete of the year for the Opolszczyzna region.  In that year, he won a bronze medal in the C-2 1000 m at the World Championships alongside Marcin Grzybowski.  In 2017, he was part of the Polish men's C-4 1000 m team that won the silver medal at the World Championships with Wiktor Glazunow, Tomasz Barniak and Marcin Grzybowski.  That year, the team also won the European title in the event.

References

Polish male canoeists
1989 births
Living people
Olympic canoeists of Poland
Canoeists at the 2012 Summer Olympics
People from Chrzanów
Sportspeople from Lesser Poland Voivodeship
ICF Canoe Sprint World Championships medalists in Canadian